Carlingford Court is a shopping centre owned by JY Group and Vicinity Centres. It is located in Carlingford, Sydney.

Transport 
Carlingford Court has bus connections to the Northern Suburbs, Hills District and Greater Western Sydney, as well as local surrounding suburbs. It is served by Busways. The majority of its bus services are located on Pennant Hills Road and Rembrandt Street.

Carlingford Court has multi level car parks with 1,472 spaces. 

From 2022 and onwards the Parramatta to Carlingford Light Rail will serve Carlingford Court on the former railway station.

History
Carlingford Court opened in 1965 as Carlingford Village on a former orchard and nursery site. The centre featured Farmers (rebranded to Grace Bros in the early 1980s and Myer in 2004), Franklins and around 50 stores. In the 1970s, the centre went a redevelopment and it was renamed Carlingford Court.

In 1983 Lendlease took ownership of the centre until July 1996 when GPT Group acquired the centre. The centre was redeveloped in 1987 and 1989 which added Target, 40 stores and a food court including fast food outlets. In 1998 Woolworths was refurbished. In 2000, a $40 million upgrade saw the shopping centre gain a Coles supermarket (replacing a Franklins), Fitness First and add 3,000 m2 of floor space.

On 31 March 2006, the 8,000 m2 Myer store closed down. Target which relocated from its space on the other side of the centre opened on the space previously occupied by Myer on both levels making it the only store in Sydney to be two storeys. The store opened in November 2006. Target's original space was filled by Bing Lee, Go-Lo and Priceline in April and June 2007.

In December 2013, the centre was acquired by Federation Limited (since renamed Vicinity Centres) and Telstra Super. In September 2022, JY Group purchased Telstra Super's shareholding.

Tenants
Carlingford Court has 33,296m² of floor space. The major retailers include Target, Coles, Woolworths, Bing Lee, The Reject Shop, Priceline Pharmacy and Fitness First.

References

External links
Carlingford Court website

Shopping centres in Sydney
Shopping malls established in 1965
1965 establishments in Australia